Football Digest was a sports magazine for fans interested in professional American football, with in-depth coverage of the National Football League (NFL). The magazine modeled the Reader's Digest idea, to bring the best in football journalism from newspapers and magazines that the fans would have otherwise not had an opportunity to read.

The final issue was published in November 2005.

It also had its own independent All-Rookie team which began in 1971 and its own All-pro team which began in the 1980s. The All-Pro team was chosen by the editorial staff which gave them the freedom to choose otherwise less-publicized players on the second-team selections. By interviewing coaches and players the editors felt they got the inside "scoop" on who the "sleepers" were for an All-Pro Team.

Awards

NFL Player of the Year
1973—	O. J. Simpson, RB, Buf
1974—	Ken Stabler, QB, Oak
1975—	O. J. Simpson, RB, Buf
1976—	Ken Stabler, QB, Oak
1977—	Walter Payton, RB, Chi
1978—	Earl Campbell, RB, Hou
1979—	Dan Fouts, QB, SD
1980—	Brian Sipe, QB, Cle
1981—	Ken Anderson, QB, Cin
1982—	Joe Theismann, QB, Was
1983—	Joe Theismann, QB, Was
1984—	Dan Marino, QB, Mia
1985—	Marcus Allen, RB, LARd
1986—	Lawrence Taylor, OLB, NYG
1987—	Jerry Rice, WR, SF
1988—	Boomer Esiason, QB, Cin
1989—	Joe Montana, QB, SF
1990—	Randall Cunningham, QB, Phi
1991—	Barry Sanders, RB, Det
1992—	Steve Young, QB, SF
1993—	Emmitt Smith, RB, Dal
1994—	Barry Sanders, RB, Det
1995—	Brett Favre, QB, GB
1996—	Brett Favre, QB, GB
1997—	Barry Sanders, RB, Det
1998—	Terrell Davis, RB, Den
1999—	Kurt Warner, QB, StL
2000—	Marshall Faulk, RB, StL
2001—	Kurt Warner, QB, StL
2002—	Rich Gannon, QB, Oak
2003—	Peyton Manning, QB, Ind
2004—	Peyton Manning, QB, Ind

NFL Defensive Player of the Year
1992 - Junior Seau, ILB, San Diego Chargers
1993 - Deion Sanders, CB, Atlanta Falcons
1994 - Charles Haley, DE, Dallas Cowboys
1995 - Merton Hanks, S, San Francisco 49ers
1996 - Bruce Smith, DE, Buffalo Bills
1997 - Dana Stubblefield, DT, San Francisco 49ers
1998 - Junior Seau, ILB, San Diego Chargers
1999 - Warren Sapp, DT, Tampa Bay Buccaneers
2000 - Ray Lewis, MLB, Baltimore Ravens
2001 - Brian Urlacher, MLB, Chicago Bears
2002 - Derrick Brooks, OLB, Tampa Bay Buccaneers
2003 - Ray Lewis, ILB, Baltimore Ravens
2004 - Ed Reed, S, Baltimore Ravens

NFL Defensive Back of the Year 
1973—	Jack Tatum, Oak
1974—	Jake Scott, Mia
1975—	Mel Blount, Pit
1976—	Monte Jackson, LA
1977—	Louis Wright, Den
1978—	Thom Darden, Cle
1979—	Lemar Parrish, Was
1980—	Nolan Cromwell, LA
1981—	Nolan Cromwell, LA
1982—	Nolan Cromwell, LA
1983—	Nolan Cromwell, LA
1984—	Kenny Easley, Sea
1985—	Wes Hopkins, Phi
1986—	Ronnie Lott, SF
1987—	Ronnie Lott, SF
1988—	Joey Browner, Min

NFL Defensive Linemen of the Year 
1973—	Alan Page, Min
1974—	Joe Greene, Pit
1975—	Joe Greene, Pit
1976—	Wally Chambers, Chi
1977—	Harvey Martin, Dal
1978—	Bubba Baker, Det
1979—	Lee Roy Selmon, TB
1980—	Randy White, Dal
1981—	Joe Klecko, NYJ
1982—	Mark Gastineau, NYJ
1983—	Doug Betters, Mia
1984—	Mark Gastineau, NYJ
1985—	Howie Long, Raid
1986—	Reggie White, Phi
1987—	Reggie White, Phi
1988—	Dan Hampton, Chi

NFL Linebacker of the Year 
1973—	Lee Roy Jordan, Dal
1974—	Mike Curtis, Bal
1975—	Jack Ham, Pit
1976—	Jack Lambert, Pit
1977—	Jack Ham, Pit
1978—	Randy Gradishar, Den
1979—	Randy Gradishar, Den
1980—	Ted Hendricks, Oak
1981—	Lawrence Taylor, NYG
1982—	Lawrence Taylor, NYG
1983—	Lawrence Taylor, NYG
1984—	Lawrence Taylor, NYG
1985—	Mike Singletary, Chi
1986—	Lawrence Taylor, NYG
1987—	Andre Tippett, NE
1988—	Mike Singletary, Chi

NFL Offensive Lineman of the Year 
1973—	Ron Yary, Min
1974—	Larry Little, Mia
1975—	Dan Dierdorf, Stl
1976—	John Hannah, NE
1977—	Art Shell, Oak
1978—	John Hannah, NE
1979—	John Hannah, NE
1980—	John Hannah, NE
1981—	Anthony Muñoz, Cin
1982—	Anthony Muñoz, Cin
1983—	John Hannah, NE
1984—	Russ Grimm, Was

NFL Running Back of the Year 
1973—	O. J. Simpson, Buf
1974—	Otis Armstrong, Den
1975—	O. J. Simpson, Buf
1976—	O. J. Simpson, Buf
1977—	Walter Payton, Chi
1978—	Earl Campbell, Hou
1979—	Earl Campbell, Hou
1980—	Earl Campbell, Hou
1981—	Tony Dorsett, Dal
1982—	Marcus Allen, Raiders
1983—	Eric Dickerson, Rams
1984—	Eric Dickerson, Rams
1985—	Marcus Allen, Raiders
1986—	Eric Dickerson, Rams
1987—	Eric Dickerson, Colts
1988—	Roger Craig, SF

NFL Receiver of the Year 
1973	Paul Warfield, Mia
1974	Cliff Branch, Oak
1975	Lynn Swann, Pit
1976	Cliff Branch, Oak
1977	Drew Pearson, Dal
1978	Lynn Swann, Pit
1979	John Jefferson, SD
1980	John Jefferson, SD
1981	Kellen Winslow, SD
1982	Wes Chandler, SD
1983	James Lofton, GB
1984	Roy Green, StL
1985	Mike Quick, Phi
1986	Jerry Rice, SF
1987	Jerry Rice, SF
1988	Anthony Carter, Min

NFL Quarterback of the Year 
1973—	Bob Griese, Mia
1974—	Ken Stabler, Oak
1975—	Fran Tarkenton, Min
1976—	Ken Stabler, Oak
1977—	Bob Griese, Mia
1978—	Terry Bradshaw, Pit
1979—	Dan Fouts, SD
1980—	Brian Sipe, Cle
1981—	Ken Anderson, Cin
1982—	Joe Theismann, Was
1983—	Joe Theismann, Was
1984—    Dan Marino, Mia
1985—	Dan Marino, Mia
1986—	Dan Marino, Mia
1987—	Joe Montana, SF
1988—	Boomer Esiason, Cin

NFL Specialists of the Year 
1974—	Terry Metcalf, StL
1975—	Billy (White Shoes) Johnson, Hou
1976—	Rick Upchurch, Den
1977—	Billy (White Shoes) Johnson, Hou
1978—	Rick Upchurch, Den
1979—	Rich Mauti, NO
1980—	J. T. Smith, KC
1981—	Mike Nelms, Was
1982—	Rick Upchurch, Den
1983—	Billy (White Shoes) Johnson, Atl

NFL Kicker of the Year 
1974—	Chester Marcol, GB
1975—	Jim Bakken, Stl
1976—	Jim Bakken, StL
1977—	Ray Guy, Oak
1978—	Ray Guy, Oak
1979—	Toni Fritsch, Hou
1980—	Dave Jennings, NYG
1981—	Pat McInally, Cin
1982—	Mark Moseley, Was
1983—	Ali Haji-Sheikh, NYG

NFL Coach of the Year 
1974—	Don Coryell, stL
1975—	Ted Marchibroda, Bal
1976—	Chuck Fairbanks, NE
1977—	Red Miller, Den
1978—	Walt Michaels, NYJ
1979—	Dick Vermeil, Phi
1980—	Chuck Knox, Buf
1981—	Bill Walsh, SF
1982—	Joe Gibbs, Was
1983—	Joe Gibbs, Was
1984-    Chuck Knox, Sea
1985-    Mike Ditka, Chi
1986-    Bill Parcells, NYG
1987-    Jim Mora, NO
1988-    Mike Ditka, Chi
1989-    Lindy Infante, GB
1990-    Don Shula, Mia
1991-    Jimmy Johnson, Dal
1992-    Bobby Ross, SD
1993-    Dan Reeves. NYG
1994-    Bill Parcells, NE
1995-    Ray Rhodes, Phi
1996-    Dom Capers, Car
1997_    Marty Schottenheimer, KC
1998_    Dan Reeves, Atl
1999--   Dick Vermeil, Stl.
2000--   Andy Reid, Phi
2001--   Dick Jauron, Chi
2002--   Jeff Fisher, Ten
2003--   Bill Belichick, NE

References
 The Awards Issue of Football Digest April 2005.

External links
 Official site

Sports magazines published in the United States
National Football League mass media
Defunct magazines published in the United States
Magazines disestablished in 2005
National Football League trophies and awards